Dore Davidson (1851–March 7, 1930) was an American stage actor. He was also a film actor active during the silent era. He was also an author and a producer.

Davidson was active in Yiddish theater before he began performing on Broadway. Broadway plays in which he appeared included Rollo's Wild Oat (1920), The Stronger Sex (1908), What the Butler Saw (1906), Mademoiselle Marni (1905), The Judgement of King Solomon (1902), To Have and to Hold (1901), and Humanity (1895).

On March 7, 1930, Davidson died in Kings Park Hospital at age 79.

Selected filmography
 Stolen Orders (1918)
 Joan of the Woods (1918)
 Humoresque (1920)
 The Daughter Pays (1920)
 The Light in the Dark (1922)
 The Good Provider (1922)
 The Rosary (1922)
 Your Best Friend (1922)
 Success (1923)
 Broadway Broke (1923)
 The Purple Highway (1923)
 None So Blind (1923)
 Grit (1924)
 Welcome Stranger (1924)
 The Great White Way (1924)
 That Royle Girl (1925)
 The Music Master (1927)
 East Side, West Side (1927)

References

External links

1851 births
1930 deaths
American male stage actors
American male film actors
American male silent film actors
20th-century American male actors
Male actors from New York City
Yiddish theatre performers